The 2007–08 Cleveland Cavaliers season was the 38th season of NBA basketball in Cleveland, Ohio. The Cavaliers were the defending Eastern Conference champions, and were coming off of an NBA Finals defeat to the San Antonio Spurs, where they were swept in four games.

In the playoffs, the Cavaliers defeated the Washington Wizards in the First Round in six games, advancing to the Semifinals, where they would lose in seven games to the eventual NBA champion, the Boston Celtics.

Key dates
 On June 28, the 2007 NBA draft took place in New York City.
 On July 1, the free agency period started.
 On October 9, the Cavaliers' pre-season began with a 62–81 loss to Washington Wizards.
 On October 31, the Cavaliers' season started with a 74–92 loss to the Dallas Mavericks.
 On November 2, the Cavaliers signed Sasha Pavlović to a multi-year extension.
 On November 2, the Cavaliers defeated the New York Knicks 110–106 for their first win.
 On November 27, the Cavaliers handed the Boston Celtics their second loss of the season.
 On December 5, the Cavaliers matched the offer sheet of the Charlotte Bobcats to retain Anderson Varejão and waived Demetris Nichols.
 On January 17, the Cavaliers defeated the San Antonio Spurs in San Antonio for the second straight year.
 On January 23, a victory over the Washington Wizards gave the Cavaliers a season-long five-game win streak.
 On February 21, in a three-team trade, the Cavaliers acquired Ben Wallace, Joe Smith, a 2009 second-round pick from the Chicago Bulls, and a trade exception, plus Wally Szczerbiak and Delonte West from the Seattle SuperSonics.
 On March 5, LeBron James scored 50 points against the New York Knicks which led to victory.
 On March 10, an 88-80 victory over the Portland Trail Blazers put the Cavaliers a season-high 10 games over 0.500.
 On May 2, the Cavaliers defeated the Washington Wizards 105–88 to advance to the second round of the NBA Playoffs.
 On May 18, the Cavaliers fell to the Boston Celtics 92–97 in Game 7 of the Eastern Conference Semifinals.

Draft picks

Cleveland did not have a draft pick in the 2007 NBA Draft due to trades from previous seasons.
 1st round pick (#22) acquired from Toronto and traded to Charlotte as part of Sasha Pavlović deal. Used to draft Jared Dudley.
 1st round pick (#24) traded to Boston and then to Phoenix as part of Jiří Welsch deal. Used to draft Rudy Fernández.
 2nd round pick (#54) traded to Orlando and then to Houston as part of Drew Gooden deal. Used to draft Brad Newley.

Roster

Regular season

Season standings

Record vs. opponents

Game log

|- bgcolor="#ffcccc"
| 1
| October 31
| Dallas
| 
| Zydrunas Ilgauskas (17)
| Zydrunas Ilgauskas (18)
| LeBron James, Daniel Gibson (4)
| Quicken Loans Arena20,562
| 0–1

|- bgcolor="#ccffcc"
| 2
| November 2
| New York
| 
| LeBron James (45)
| Zydrunas Ilgauskas (12)
| LeBron James (7)
| Quicken Loans Arena20,562
| 1–1
|- bgcolor="#ffcccc"
| 3
| November 4
| @ Phoenix
| 
| LeBron James (27)
| Drew Gooden (14)
| LeBron James (8)
| US Airways Center18,422
| 1–2
|- bgcolor="#ccffcc"
| 4
| November 6
| @ Golden State
| 
| LeBron James (24)
| Zydrunas Ilgauskas (14)
| LeBron James (9)
| Oracle Arena19,596
| 2–2
|- bgcolor="#ffcccc"
| 5
| November 7
| @ Utah
| 
| LeBron James (32)
| LeBron James (15)
| LeBron James (13)
| EnergySolutions Arena19,911
| 2–3
|- bgcolor="#ccffcc"
| 6
| November 9
| @ Sacramento
| 
| LeBron James (26)
| Zydrunas Ilgauskas (15)
| LeBron James (4)
| ARCO Arena15,293
| 3–3
|- bgcolor="#ccffcc"
| 7
| November 11
| @ L. A. Clippers
| 
| Zydrunas Ilgauskas (25)
| Drew Gooden (16)
| LeBron James (8)
| STAPLES Center15,541
| 4–3
|- bgcolor="#ffcccc"
| 8
| November 12
| @ Denver
| 
| LeBron James (27)
| Dwayne Jones (10)
| LeBron James (4)
| Pepsi Center19,155
| 4–4
|- bgcolor="#ffcccc"
| 9
| November 14
| Orlando
| 
| LeBron James (39)
| LeBron James (13)
| LeBron James (14)
| Quicken Loans Arena20,562
| 4–5
|- bgcolor="#ccffcc"
| 10
| November 16
| Utah
| 
| LeBron James (40)
| Zydrunas Ilgauskas (12)
| LeBron James (9)
| Quicken Loans Arena19,862
| 5–5
|- bgcolor="#ffcccc"
| 11
| November 20
| Milwaukee
| 
| LeBron James (34)
| Drew Gooden (13)
| LeBron James (7)
| Quicken Loans Arena20,115
| 5–6
|- bgcolor="#ccffcc"
| 12
| November 21
| @ Minnesota
| 
| LeBron James (45)
| Zydrunas Ilgauskas, Dwayne Jones (10)
| LeBron James, Daniel Gibson (5)
| Target Center15,224
| 6–6
|- bgcolor="#ccffcc"
| 13
| November 24
| Toronto
| 
| LeBron James (37)
| Zydrunas Ilgauskas (15)
| LeBron James (12)
| Quicken Loans Arena20,018
| 7–6
|- bgcolor="#ccffcc"
| 14
| November 25
| @ Indiana
| 
| LeBron James (30)
| Drew Gooden (12)
| LeBron James (10)
| Conseco Fieldhouse11,603
| 8–6
|- bgcolor="#ccffcc"
| 15
| November 27
| Boston
| 
| LeBron James (38)
| Zydrunas Ilgauskas (15)
| LeBron James (13)
| Quicken Loans Arena20,562
| 9–6
|- bgcolor="#ffcccc"
| 16
| November 28
| @ Detroit
| 
| LeBron James (15)
| Drew Gooden (9)
| LeBron James (3)
| The Palace of Auburn Hills22,076
| 9–7
|- bgcolor="#ffcccc"
| 17
| November 30
| @ Toronto
| 
| Daniel Gibson (24)
| Drew Gooden (14)
| Daniel Gibson (7)
| Air Canada Centre19,800
| 9–8

|- bgcolor="#ffcccc"
| 18
| December 2
| @ Boston
| 
| Zydrunas Ilgauskas (12)
| Zydrunas Ilgauskas (13)
| Zydrunas Ilgauskas, Dwayne Jones, Eric Snow, Damon Jones, Devin Brown (2)
| TD Garden18,624
| 9–9
|- bgcolor="#ffcccc"
| 19
| December 4
| New Jersey
| 
| Shannon Brown (20)
| Dwayne Jones (12)
| Daniel Gibson, Shannon Brown (4)
| Quicken Loans Arena19,838
| 9–10
|- bgcolor="#ffcccc"
| 20
| December 5
| @ Washington
| 
| Daniel Gibson, Drew Gooden, Shannon Brown (13)
| Zydrunas Ilgauskas (10)
| Daniel Gibson (8)
| Verizon Center17,684
| 9–11
|- bgcolor="#ffcccc"
| 21
| December 8
| @ Charlotte
| 
| Larry Hughes (22)
| Drew Gooden (9)
| Daniel Gibson, Shannon Brown (3)
| Charlotte Bobcats Arena17,624
| 9–12
|- bgcolor="#ccffcc"
| 22
| December 11
| Indiana
| 
| Larry Hughes (36)
| Drew Gooden (11)
| LeBron James, Eric Snow (5)
| Quicken Loans Arena20,010
| 10–12
|- bgcolor="#ffcccc"
| 23
| December 14
| @ New Jersey
| 
| LeBron James (29)
| Zydrunas Ilgauskas (12)
| LeBron James (8)
| Izod Center15,242
| 10–13
|- bgcolor="#ffcccc"
| 24
| December 15
| Philadelphia
| 
| LeBron James, Drew Gooden (21)
| Drew Gooden (10)
| LeBron James, Eric Snow (6)
| Quicken Loans Arena20,562
| 10–14
|- bgcolor="#ccffcc"
| 25
| December 17
| Milwaukee
| 
| LeBron James (31)
| Zydrunas Ilgauskas (11)
| Devin Brown (6)
| Quicken Loans Arena20,562
| 11–14
|- bgcolor="#ffcccc"
| 26
| December 19
| @ New York
| 
| LeBron James (32)
| LeBron James (8)
| LeBron James (6)
| Madison Square Garden18,704
| 11–15
|- bgcolor="#ccffcc"
| 27
| December 20
| L. A. Lakers
| 
| LeBron James (33)
| Anderson Varejao (15)
| LeBron James (5)
| Quicken Loans Arena20,562
| 12–15
|- bgcolor="#ffcccc"
| 28
| December 23
| Golden State
| 
| LeBron James (25)
| Anderson Varejao (11)
| LeBron James (8)
| Quicken Loans Arena20,562
| 12–16
|- bgcolor="#ccffcc"
| 29
| December 25
| Miami
| 
| LeBron James (25)
| Drew Gooden (9)
| LeBron James (12)
| Quicken Loans Arena20,562
| 13–16
|- bgcolor="#ccffcc"
| 30
| December 27
| @ Dallas
| 
| LeBron James (24)
| Zydrunas Ilgauskas (11)
| LeBron James (7)
| American Airlines Center20,462
| 14–16
|- bgcolor="#ffcccc"
| 31
| December 29
| @ New Orleans
| 
| LeBron James (21)
| Zydrunas Ilgauskas (12)
| LeBron James (6)
| New Orleans Arena17,623
| 14–17

|- bgcolor="#ccffcc"
| 32
| January 2
| Atlanta
| 
| LeBron James (36)
| Anderson Varejao (11)
| LeBron James (6)
| Quicken Loans Arena20,562
| 15–17
|- bgcolor="#ccffcc"
| 33
| January 4
| Sacramento
| 
| LeBron James (24)
| Zydrunas Ilgauskas (15)
| LeBron James (10)
| Quicken Loans Arena20,562
| 16–17
|- bgcolor="#ccffcc"
| 34
| January 6
| @ Toronto
| 
| LeBron James (39)
| Anderson Varejao (13)
| LeBron James (8)
| Air Canada Centre19,800
| 17–17
|- bgcolor="#ccffcc"
| 35
| January 8
| Seattle
| 
| LeBron James (22)
| Anderson Varejao, Zydrunas Ilgauskas (9)
| Zydrunas Ilgauskas (4)
| Quicken Loans Arena20,409
| 18–17
|- bgcolor="#ffcccc"
| 36
| January 9
| @ Atlanta
| 
| LeBron James (31)
| Drew Gooden (11)
| LeBron James (6)
| Philips Arena16,246
| 18–18
|- bgcolor="#ccffcc"
| 37
| January 11
| Charlotte
| 
| LeBron James (31)
| LeBron James (19)
| LeBron James (8)
| Quicken Loans Arena20,562
| 19–18
|- bgcolor="#ccffcc"
| 38
| January 15
| @ Memphis
| 
| LeBron James (51)
| Drew Gooden (11)
| LeBron James (9)
| FedEx Forum13,871
| 20–18
|- bgcolor="#ccffcc"
| 39
| January 17
| @ San Antonio
| 
| LeBron James (27)
| Anderson Varejao (14)
| LeBron James (7)
| AT&T Center18,482
| 21–18
|- bgcolor="#ccffcc"
| 40
| January 21
| @ Miami
| 
| LeBron James (28)
| Zydrunas Ilgauskas (11)
| LeBron James (5)
| AmericanAirlines Arena19,600
| 22–18
|- bgcolor="#ccffcc"
| 41
| January 23
| Washington
| 
| Zydrunas Ilgauskas (24)
| Drew Gooden (10)
| LeBron James (8)
| Quicken Loans Arena20,562
| 23–18
|- bgcolor="#ffcccc"
| 42
| January 25
| Phoenix
| 
| LeBron James (36)
| Zydrunas Ilgauskas (10)
| LeBron James, Daniel Gibson (5)
| Quicken Loans Arena20,562
| 23–19
|- bgcolor="#ccffcc"
| 43
| January 27
| @ L. A. Lakers
| 
| LeBron James (41)
| Zydrunas Ilgauskas (11)
| LeBron James, Larry Hughes (4)
| STAPLES Center18,997
| 24–19
|- bgcolor="#ccffcc"
| 44
| January 30
| @ Portland
| 
| LeBron James (37)
| LeBron James (14)
| LeBron James (4)
| Rose Garden Arena20,501
| 25–19
|- bgcolor="#ffcccc"
| 45
| January 31
| @ Seattle
| 
| Larry Hughes (28)
| Zydrunas Ilgauskas (9)
| Daniel Gibson (6)
| KeyArena13,109
| 25–20

|- bgcolor="#ccffcc"
| 46
| February 2
| L. A. Clippers
| 
| LeBron James (28)
| Zydrunas Ilgauskas (13)
| LeBron James (7)
| Quicken Loans Arena20,562
| 26–20
|- bgcolor="#ccffcc"
| 47
| February 5
| Boston
| 
| LeBron James (33)
| Zydrunas Ilgauskas (10)
| LeBron James (12)
| Quicken Loans Arena20,562
| 27–20
|- bgcolor="#ffcccc"
| 48
| February 7
| @ Houston
| 
| LeBron James (32)
| Zydrunas Ilgauskas (8)
| LeBron James (6)
| Toyota Center18,402
| 27–21
|- bgcolor="#ccffcc"
| 49
| February 8
| @ Atlanta
| 
| LeBron James (26)
| LeBron James, Zydrunas Ilgauskas (11)
| LeBron James (7)
| Philips Arena19,335
| 28–21
|- bgcolor="#ffcccc"
| 50
| February 10
| Denver
| 
| LeBron James (30)
| Zydrunas Ilgauskas (10)
| LeBron James, Devin Brown, Damon Jones, Eric Snow (3)
| Quicken Loans Arena20,562
| 28–22
|- bgcolor="#ccffcc"
| 51
| February 11
| @ Orlando
| 
| Larry Hughes (40)
| LeBron James, Donyell Marshall (7)
| LeBron James (10)
| Amway Arena17,519
| 29–22
|- bgcolor="#ffcccc"
| 52
| February 13
| San Antonio
| 
| LeBron James (39)
| Drew Gooden (11)
| LeBron James (9)
| Quicken Loans Arena20,562
| 29–23
|- align="center"
|colspan="9" bgcolor="#bbcaff"|All-Star Break
|- bgcolor="#ffcccc"
| 53
| February 19
| Houston
| 
| LeBron James (26)
| LeBron James (13)
| LeBron James (11)
| Quicken Loans Arena20,562
| 29–24
|- bgcolor="#ccffcc"
| 54
| February 20
| @ Indiana
| 
| LeBron James (31)
| Zydrunas Ilgauskas (17)
| LeBron James (12)
| Conseco Fieldhouse13,096
| 30–24
|- bgcolor="#ccffcc"
| 55
| February 22
| Washington
| 
| LeBron James (33)
| LeBron James (15)
| LeBron James (8)
| Quicken Loans Arena20,562
| 31–24
|- bgcolor="#ccffcc"
| 56
| February 24
| Memphis
| 
| LeBron James (25)
| Zydrunas Ilgauskas (13)
| LeBron James (11)
| Quicken Loans Arena20,562
| 32–24
|- bgcolor="#ffcccc"
| 57
| February 26
| @ Milwaukee
| 
| LeBron James (35)
| Ben Wallace (11)
| Delonte West (7)
| Bradley Center15,346
| 32–25
|- bgcolor="#ffcccc"
| 58
| February 27
| @ Boston
| 
| LeBron James (26)
| Zydrunas Ilgauskas (12)
| LeBron James (4)
| TD Garden18,624
| 32–26
|- bgcolor="#ccffcc"
| 59
| February 29
| Minnesota
| 
| LeBron James (30)
| Ben Wallace (9)
| Delonte West (13)
| Quicken Loans Arena20,562
| 33–26

|- bgcolor="#ccffcc"
| 60
| March 2
| Chicago
| 
| LeBron James (37)
| Ben Wallace, Anderson Varejao (8)
| LeBron James (6)
| Quicken Loans Arena20,562
| 34–26
|- bgcolor="#ccffcc"
| 61
| March 5
| @ New York
| 
| LeBron James (50)
| Joe Smith (11)
| LeBron James (10)
| Madison Square Garden18,760
| 35–26
|- bgcolor="#ffcccc"
| 62
| March 6
| @ Chicago
| 
| LeBron James (39)
| Anderson Varejao, Ben Wallace (10)
| Devin Brown (4)
| United Center22,097
| 35–27
|- bgcolor="#ccffcc"
| 63
| March 8
| Indiana
| 
| LeBron James (38)
| Anderson Varejao (16)
| Anderson Varejao, Delonte West (6)
| Quicken Loans Arena20,562
| 36–27
|- bgcolor="#ccffcc"
| 64
| March 10
| Portland
| 
| LeBron James (24)
| LeBron James (10)
| LeBron James (11)
| Quicken Loans Arena20,213
| 37–27
|- bgcolor="#ffcccc"
| 65
| March 12
| @ New Jersey
| 
| LeBron James (42)
| LeBron James (11)
| LeBron James (7)
| Izod Center18,287
| 37–28
|- bgcolor="#ffcccc"
| 66
| March 13
| @ Washington
| 
| LeBron James (25)
| Anderson Varejao (12)
| LeBron James, Delonte West (7)
| Verizon Center20,173
| 37–29
|- bgcolor="#ccffcc"
| 67
| March 16
| Charlotte
| 
| LeBron James (33)
| Ben Wallace (15)
| LeBron James (10)
| Quicken Loans Arena20,562
| 38–29
|- bgcolor="#ffcccc"
| 68
| March 17
| @ Orlando
| 
| LeBron James (30)
| LeBron James (9)
| LeBron James (6)
| Amway Arena17,519
| 38–30
|- bgcolor="#ccffcc"
| 69
| March 19
| Detroit
| 
| LeBron James (30)
| Zydrunas Ilgauskas, Ben Wallace (8)
| LeBron James, Delonte West (6)
| Quicken Loans Arena20,562
| 39–30
|- bgcolor="#ccffcc"
| 70
| March 21
| Toronto
| 
| LeBron James (29)
| LeBron James (12)
| Damon Jones (7)
| Quicken Loans Arena20,562
| 40–30
|- bgcolor="#ffcccc"
| 71
| March 22
| @ Milwaukee
| 
| LeBron James (29)
| LeBron James, Anderson Varejao (11)
| LeBron James, Wally Szczerbiak, Damon Jones (4)
| Bradley Center15,337
| 40–31
|- bgcolor="#ffcccc"
| 72
| March 26
| New Orleans
| 
| Zydrunas Ilgauskas (29)
| Zydrunas Ilgauskas, Anderson Varejao (15)
| LeBron James (8)
| Quicken Loans Arena20,562
| 40–32
|- bgcolor="#ffcccc"
| 73
| March 29
| @ Detroit
| 
| LeBron James (13)
| Anderson Varejao (9)
| Damon Jones (6)
| The Palace of Auburn Hills22,076
| 40–33
|- bgcolor="#ccffcc"
| 74
| March 30
| Philadelphia
| 
| LeBron James (26)
| LeBron James (9)
| Delonte West (11)
| Quicken Loans Arena20,562
| 41–33

|- bgcolor="#ccffcc"
| 75
| April 2
| @ Charlotte
| 
| LeBron James (29)
| Zydrunas Ilgauskas, Anderson Varejao (12)
| Devin Brown (8)
| Charlotte Bobcats Arena15,106
| 42–33
|- bgcolor="#ffcccc"
| 76
| April 3
| Chicago
| 
| LeBron James (33)
| Wally Szczerbiak, Ben Wallace (8)
| Devin Brown, Delonte West (5)
| Quicken Loans Arena20,562
| 42–34
|- bgcolor="#ffcccc"
| 77
| April 5
| Orlando
| 
| Delonte West (19)
| Zydrunas Ilgauskas, Ben Wallace (9)
| LeBron James (9)
| Quicken Loans Arena20,562
| 42–35
|- bgcolor="#ccffcc"
| 78
| April 9
| New Jersey
| 
| LeBron James (33)
| Anderson Varejao (9)
| LeBron James (8)
| Quicken Loans Arena20,063
| 43–35
|- bgcolor="#ffcccc"
| 79
| April 11
| @ Chicago
| 
| LeBron James (34)
| Anderson Varejao (8)
| Delonte West (6)
| United Center22,084
| 43–36
|- bgcolor="#ccffcc"
| 80
| April 13
| Miami
| 
| Delonte West (18)
| Zydrunas Ilgauskas (14)
| LeBron James (7)
| Quicken Loans Arena20,562
| 44–36
|- bgcolor="#ccffcc"
| 81
| April 14
| @ Philadelphia
| 
| LeBron James (27)
| Anderson Varejao (8)
| LeBron James (5)
| Wachovia Center20,730
| 45–36
|- bgcolor="#ffcccc"
| 82
| April 16
| Detroit
| 
| Wally Szczerbiak (18)
| Dwayne Jones (10)
| Delonte West (7)
| Quicken Loans Arena20,562
| 45–37

Playoffs

|- align="center" bgcolor="ccffcc"
| 1 || April 19 || Washington || W 93–86 || LeBron James (32) || Žydrūnas Ilgauskas (11) || Gibson, West (5) ||Quicken Loans Arena20,562 || 1–0
|- align="center" bgcolor="ccffcc"
| 2 || April 21 || Washington || W 116–86 || LeBron James (30) || Ilgauskas, James (9) || LeBron James (12) ||Quicken Loans Arena20,562 || 2–0
|- align="center" bgcolor="ffcccc"
| 3 || April 24 || @ Washington || L 72–108 || LeBron James (22) || Anderson Varejão (9) || three players tied (3) ||Verizon Center20,173 || 2–1
|- align="center" bgcolor="ccffcc"
| 4 || April 27 || @ Washington || W 100–97 || LeBron James (34) || James, Wallace (12) || LeBron James (7) ||Verizon Center20,173 || 3–1
|- align="center" bgcolor="ffcccc"
| 5 || April 30 || Washington || L 87–88 || LeBron James (34) || LeBron James (10) || Delonte West (8) ||Quicken Loans Arena20,562 || 3–2
|- align="center" bgcolor="ccffcc"
| 6 || May 2 || @ Washington || W 105–88 || LeBron James (27) || LeBron James (13) || LeBron James (13) ||Verizon Center20,173 || 4–2
|-

|- align="center" bgcolor="ffcccc"
| 1 || May 6 || @ Boston || L 72–76 || Žydrūnas Ilgauskas (22) || Žydrūnas Ilgauskas (12) || LeBron James (9) || TD Banknorth Garden18,624 || 0–1
|- align="center" bgcolor="ffcccc"
| 2 || May 8 || @ Boston || L 73–89 || LeBron James (21) || Anderson Varejão (10) || LeBron James (6) || TD Banknorth Garden18,624 || 0–2
|- align="center" bgcolor="ccffcc"
| 3 || May 10 || Boston || W 108–84 || James, West (21) || Ben Wallace (9) || LeBron James (8) || Quicken Loans Arena20,562 || 1–2
|- align="center" bgcolor="ccffcc"
| 4 || May 12 || Boston || W 88–77 || LeBron James (21) || Ilgauskas, Wallace (7) || LeBron James (13) || Quicken Loans Arena20,562 || 2–2
|- align="center" bgcolor="ffcccc"
| 5 || May 14 || @ Boston || L 89–96 || LeBron James (35) || Ilgauskas, Varejão (7) || LeBron James (5) || TD Banknorth Garden18,624 || 2–3
|- align="center" bgcolor="ccffcc"
| 6 || May 16 || Boston || W 74–69 || LeBron James (32) || LeBron James (12) || LeBron James (6) || Quicken Loans Arena20,562 || 3–3
|- align="center" bgcolor="ffcccc"
| 7 || May 18 || @ Boston || L 92–97 || LeBron James (45) || Joe Smith (6) || LeBron James (6) || TD Banknorth Garden18,624 || 3–4
|-

Player stats

Regular season 

*Statistics include only games with the Cavaliers

Playoffs

Awards, records and milestones

Awards
 LeBron James was named the Eastern Conference Player of the Week for games played from November 19 through November 25.
 LeBron James was named the Eastern Conference Player of the Week for games played December 31, 2007 through January 6, 2008.
 LeBron James was named the Eastern Conference Player of the Month for January 2008.
 Mike Brown was named the Eastern Conference Coach of the Month for January 2008.
 Daniel Gibson, 33 points, was named the MVP of the Rookie Challenge Game during NBA All-Star Week on February 15, 2008.
 LeBron James, 27 points, 9 assists, 8 rebounds, was named the MVP of the NBA All-Star Game during NBA All-Star week on February 17, 2008.
 LeBron James was named the Eastern Conference Player of the Week for games played from February 18 through February 24.
 LeBron James was named the Eastern Conference Player of the Month for February 2008.

Records

Milestones
 On December 17, 2007 LeBron James became the youngest NBA player to score 9,000 points.
 On February 11, 2008 Drew Gooden grabbed his 2,500th rebound as a Cavalier.  Gooden is the 9th Cavalier to reach that milestone.
 On February 11, 2008 Larry Hughes scored his 2,000th point as a Cavalier.  Hughes is the 44th Cavalier to reach that milestone.
 On February 13, 2008 Žydrūnas Ilgauskas blocked his 1,100th shot as a Cavalier.  Ilgauskas is the 2nd Cavalier to reach that milestone.
 On February 20, 2008 Zydrunas Ilgauskas scored his 9,000th point as a Cavalier. Ilgauskas is the 6th Cavalier to reach that milestone.
 On February 20, 2008 LeBron James played his 15,000th minute as a Cavalier. James is the 8th Cavalier to reach that milestone.
 On February 22, 2008 Zydrunas Ilgauskas grabbed his 2,000th offensive rebound as a Cavalier. Ilgauskas is the team leader in offensive rebounds.
 On February 22, 2008 Damon Jones hit is 300th three pointer as a Cavalier. Jones is the 6th Cavalier to reach that milestone.
 On February 22, 2008 LeBron James grabbed his 2,500th rebound as a Cavalier. James is the 10th Cavalier to reach that milestone.
 On February 27, 2008 LeBron James became the youngest NBA player to score 10,000 points.
 On March 19, 2008 LeBron James dished his 2,500th assist as a Cavalier. James is the 2nd Cavalier to reach that milestone.
 On March 26, 2008 Žydrūnas Ilgauskas grabbed his 5,000th rebound as a Cavalier.  Ilgauskas is the 2nd Cavalier to reach that milestone.
 On March 29, 2008 LeBron James made his 500th three point shot as a Cavalier. James is the 4th Cavalier to reach that milestone.

All-Star
 Daniel Gibson participated in the 2008 Rookie Challenge Game on February 15, 2008 and was named the MVP.
 Daniel Gibson participated in the 2008 Three Point Contest on February 16, 2008 and finished in second place.
 LeBron James started the 2008 All-Star Game on February 17, 2008 and was named the MVP.

Transactions
The Cavaliers have been involved in the following transactions during the 2007–08 season.

Trades

*Note: This is the largest trade in Cleveland Cavaliers history.

Free agents

See also
 2007–08 NBA season

References

 Cleveland Cavaliers on Database Basketball
 Cleveland Cavaliers on Basketball Reference

External links

 Cleveland Cavaliers official website

Cleveland Cavaliers seasons
2007–08 NBA season by team
Cleve
Cleve